Tianhe Road is a station on Line 2 of the Chengdu Metro in China. The station is also served by Chengdu Tram Line T2.

Station layout

References

Railway stations in Sichuan
Railway stations in China opened in 2013
Chengdu Metro stations